Jeziorowice - a village in Poland located in the Silesian Voivodeship, in the Zawiercie poviat, in the Żarnowiec commune.

The royal village was located in the second half of the 16th century in the Lelów poviat of the Krakow Province, its tenutary in 1595 was Andrzej Potocki. In the years 1975–1998 the town administratively belonged to the Katowice Province

Name

The name of the village in the Latinized form of the old Polish Jezyorowycze villa is mentioned in the years (1470-1480) by Jan Długosz in the book of Liber beneficiorum dioecesis Cracoviensis.

History

In the 15th century it was a royal village mentioned by Długosz, belonging to the Żarnowiec parish. At the beginning of the 16th century, sources mention 7. peasants in Jeziorowice. In 1627, as a result of the then raging plague, there were 3 peasants in the village. Around 1650 the village was put in as a pledge. According to the lustration from 1660, a non-castle district of Jeziorowickie, separated from the Żarnowiec eldership, along with the farm and adjacent lands in the Krakow Province, Lelów Poviat, was established here. In 1771, Jeziorowice was owned by Antoni Sikorski, a swordfish from Chęciny. In the years 1773–1775 at the Warsaw Seym of the Polish-Lithuanian Commonwealth, Sikorski was granted the possession of the Jeziorowice eldership for 40 years, for carrying out drainage for PLN 40,000, provided that he did not give up this property earlier than the Treasury of Poland would pay him that sum. In the nineteenth century, Jeziorowice and the farm belonging to the Małoszyce estate were incorporated into the majorate of Żarnowiec. During the Kingdom of Poland, Małoszyce, Otola and Jeziorowice were combined into one unit, under the name Dobra Małoszyce, and was given to General Fejchtner in 1877. In 1906, Jeziorowice was hitherto included in the parish St. Wojciech in Łany Wielkie, was incorporated into the Rokitno parish. This year, 57 farms and 44 houses were listed. In 1988, there were 50 houses in Jeziorowice.

In the 15th-16th centuries there was an inn in the village, and in the 18th century a school and grange at the turn of the 19th and 20th centuries.

References

Jeziorowice